Pehrest-e Olya (also Romanized as Pehrest-e ‘Olyā; also known as Pahrast, Pahrost, Pahrost-e Bālā, Pehrost, and Pohrost) is a village in Bala Deh Rural District, Beyram District, Larestan County, Fars Province, Iran. At the 2006 census, its population was 163, in 30 families.

References 

Populated places in Larestan County